Lieutenant Colonel James Abercrombie (1732 – 23 June 1775) was a British army officer who died during the American Revolutionary War.

There is much uncertainty about Abercrombie's family. He may have been related to General James Abercrombie, as described in Appletons' Cyclopedia of American Biography, but the Dictionary of Canadian Biography states that the common identification of him as the general's son or nephew is probably erroneous.

On 11 June 1744 Abercrombie was made Lieutenant of the 1st Foot. On 16 February 1756, he was promoted to the rank of Captain of the 42nd Foot. With this rank he served in the French and Indian War, notably as one of General Abercrombie's aides in the Battle of Fort Carillon at Ticonderoga in 1758 before being made aide-de-camp to General Amherst in 1759. He was promoted to the rank of lieutenant colonel in 1770.

On 17 June 1775, Abercrombie led the grenadier battalion in their charge of the redoubt on the Americans' left wing at the Battle of Bunker Hill. During the assault on Breed's Hill, he sustained a large gunshot wound on his right thigh from an African soldier named Salem Poor, although there is probability that it was friendly fire. After removal from the Bunker Hill battleground, he was treated at a hospital facility in Boston. He succumbed to his wound a week later at the residence of British military engineer John Montresor.

Legacy 
 namesake of Abercrombie, Nova Scotia

See also
Richard Frothingham Jr.

References 

 
Wilson, James G; Fiske, John (1888) "Abercrombie, James" in Appletons' Cyclopedia of American Biography. D. Appleton and Company, New York.

External links
 

1732 births
1775 deaths
42nd Regiment of Foot officers
British Army personnel of the French and Indian War
British Army personnel of the American Revolutionary War
British military personnel killed in the American Revolutionary War